Académie De Roberval is a small French high school located in Montreal, Quebec containing approximately over 550 students. It is a part of the Centre de services scolaire de Montréal (CSSDM).

Informations 

 Académie De Roberval is a school with an enriched educational project. Whether by offering enrichment in all subjects, or by imposing local programs such as Latin and methodology. Académie De Roberval has a specific educational project.
 Most students use different acronyms to refer to Académie De Roberval:  D-Rob,  ADR, etc.
 The Académie De Roberval, which is located on the edge of the Villeray and  Saint-Michel districts, is a two-minute walk from the Fabre metro station. 
 The student's admission to this free public school is done after passing an admission exam.
 The Academy is located since January 2018 at 1205 Rue Jarry Est. It was for several problems (mold, heating, plumbing, etc.) that the school had to move.

Encriched Program 
The program offered by the Académie De Roberval is a program enriched with subjects such as Latin (offered to secondary 1 and 2 students), Spanish (offered to secondary 3 students) cinema (offered to secondary 4 students and 5) which is an optional course offered only at the Academy, and many other options such as Entrepreneurship, Drama or Personal Orientation Project (PPO). In addition, an English first language course is offered to English-speaking or fluent English-speaking students. The three mathematical sequences are offered to students (CST, TS, SN) with six lessons per nine-day cycle. Since fall 2013, integrative project (IP) and community engagement courses have been offered outside of the schedule.

Board 
Since 2012, the director of Académie De Roberval has been Mrs. Luisa Cordoba and her assistant is Bruno Laberge. During the last decades, the status of the school has changed enormously.

From January 2018 to July 2019, the director of the Academy was Jaziel Petrone and his assistant was still Bruno Laberge.

Since August 2019, Mr. Laberge is director and Marie-Claude Bachand becomes his assistant.

Address Change 
In December 2017, the school building closed due to mold. The old school building was located at 1385 Rue de Castelnau E, behind the Jean-Talon Hospital and near the Fabre metro station. Since then, the school has not finished the planned work with a budget of $ 14.5 million.

References

External links 
 

High schools in Montreal